Green Manor is a Franco-Belgian comics series written by Fabien Vehlmann, illustrated by Denis Bodart and published by Dupuis in French and Cinebook in English. I's a humoristic detective series set in the United Kingdom at the end of the 19th century.

Volumes
 Assassins et Gentlemen - Jan 2001 
 De l'inconvénient d'être mort - Feb 2002 
 Fantaisies meurtrières - Apr 2005

Translations
Cinebook Ltd is publishing Green Manor. The last two volumes have been compiled together into one English volume.:

 Assassins and Gentlemen - May 2008 
 The Inconvenience of Being Dead - Sept 2008

Reception
The first Cinebook volume was reviewed by who complimented the structure and writing ("These stories get straight to the point and keep you there"), said that "[t]he art is gorgeous," before concluding that "[t]he book might be nearly $14, but the art and the storytelling density make for a better value than what that number looks like on the page."

Awards
The title was nominated for the 2002 Angoulême International Comics Festival Prize for Scenario.

Notes

References

 Green Manor at Bedetheque
 
 
 
 
 
 

Bandes dessinées
Belgian comic strips
2001 comics debuts
2005 comics endings
Dupuis titles
Belgian graphic novels
Humor comics
Crime comics
Detective comics
Comics set in the United Kingdom
Comics set in the 19th century